Harish Chandra Mehta is a university lecturer and historian of the Foreign Relations of the United States.

Journalistic career 

He has written for newspapers.

Books 

Mehta has written three books on Cambodia: Hun Sen: Strongman of Cambodia (co-author Julie Mehta) is based on several hours of interviews with Prime Minister Hun Sen, whom the authors have known personally for twenty-one years; an updated edition was published in 2013. It has been criticised by reviewers as being hagiographic and plagued by extreme partiality towards Hun Sen.

Awards 

As a historian, Mehta has won the Samuel Flagg Bemis Award in 2008 and 2007 given by the Society for Historians of American Foreign Relations.

References 

Year of birth missing (living people)
Living people
Historians of Southeast Asia
American male journalists